Ingus Veips (born 12 December 1969) is a Latvian former cyclist. He competed in the track time trial at the 1992 Summer Olympics.

References

External links
 
 

1969 births
Living people
Latvian male cyclists
Olympic cyclists of Latvia
Cyclists at the 1992 Summer Olympics
People from Madona